Linda Maserame Motlhalo (born 1 July 1998) is a South African professional soccer player who plays as a winger for SWPL 1 club Glasgow City and the South Africa women's national team. She is also known as the 'Randfontein Ronaldinho'.

Early life
Linda Motlhalo was born in Badirile, Brandvlei, in Randfontein, Gauteng, on 7 January 1998. Her family has a footballing history, with her father Johannes Motlhalo attempting to become a professional player. Although he failed to do so, his brother Joseph Motlhalo became a goalkeeper for Kaizer Chiefs F.C. between 1970 and 1985.

Motlhalo attended TuksSport High School, during which time she was part of the South African High Performance Centre in Pretoria.

Club career

Houston Dash
On 1 February 2018 Motlhalo signed with the Houston Dash in the National Women's Soccer League. She was brought in by Dash head coach Vera Pauw who coached the South African national team from 2014 to 2016. Motlhalo made 21 NWSL appearances for the Dash and scored 1 goal.

Motlhalo was waived by the Houston Dash on 6 February 2019.

Beijing BG Phoenix F.C.
On 22 February 2019 Motlhalo was unveiled as a player of Beijing BG Phoenix F.C. in the Chinese Women's Super League, joining her South African and former Houston Dash teammate Thembi Kgatlana who also made the move to China.

Motlhalo started all 14 league games for Beijing across the 2019 season as the team finished fifth in the CWSL, playing the majority of the campaign in a deeper central midfield role. She also helped guide Beijing to a semifinal finish in the Chinese Women's Championship.

Djurgårdens IF

On 18 January 2020 it was announced that Motlhalo had joined Swedish side Djurgårdens IF on a two-year deal, subject to receipt of her working visa.

Motlhalo made her debut on 22 February 2020, scoring twice after coming on as a substitute in a Stockholm derby victory over AIK. In January 2021 she was named Newcomer of the Year by her Djurgården teammates for her performances across the 2020 season.

In January 2022, it was announced that Motlhalo had signed a new two-year contract to remain at the club.

Glasgow City 
On 23 January 2023, Motlhalo officially joined SWPL 1 club Glasgow City on a permanent deal, signing a contract until June 2025 with the Scottish club.

International career
While attending the High Performance Centre, Motlhalo played for the South Africa women's national under-20 football team as a forward. This included in matches as part of the 2015 African U-20 Women's World Cup Qualifying Tournament.

Motlhalo was called up to the senior squad for the first time in October 2015, following an injury to Thembi Kgatlana which caused her to be withdrawn from the team. Motlhalo did not play at the time, but instead made her debut against Cameroon in 2016, in which she scored in the 2–2 draw. She said, "I am just happy to have been part of this team. The senior players have made me feel at home and it was good to rub shoulders with the likes of Janine and Amanda. I really enjoyed my time here."

In 2016, Motlhalo attended the 2016 Summer Olympics in Rio de Janeiro, before playing the 2016 Africa Women Cup of Nations in Cameroon as part of the Banyana Banyana side.

At the 2018 Africa Women Cup of Nations in Ghana, Motlhalo started all five games for South Africa as the team reached the final of the competition before losing to Nigeria on penalties. She scored one goal at the competition and was named Player of the Match during her side's semifinal encounter with Mali.

Motlhalo attended the 2019 FIFA Women's World Cup with South Africa but came into the tournament struggling with injury. While she started the side's opening game with Spain, the remainder of her tournament was limited to a late substitute appearance against China.

In September 2021, Motlhalo scored for South Africa in a decisive 4–2 win over Nigeria as Banyana Banyana won the inaugural Aisha Buhari Cup in Lagos. Motlhalo was subsequently South Africa's top-scorer in qualification for the 2022 Africa Women Cup of Nations, scoring five goals across four fixtures with Mozambique and Algeria to help Banyana Banyana book a place at the finals.

International goals
Scores and results list South Africa's goal tally first

Honours

International
2022 Africa Women Cup of Nations Winner
2018 Africa Women Cup of Nations runner-up
2021 Aisha Buhari Cup champion

Individual
2018 COSAFA Women's Championship top-scorer
2020 Djurgårdens IF Newcomer of the Year

References

External links
 
 Houston Dash bio
 
 

1998 births
Living people
People from Hantam Local Municipality
South African women's soccer players
Footballers at the 2016 Summer Olympics
South Africa women's international soccer players
Olympic soccer players of South Africa
South African expatriate soccer players
Houston Dash players
National Women's Soccer League players
Women's association football midfielders
2019 FIFA Women's World Cup players
Beijing BG Phoenix F.C. players
Damallsvenskan players
Djurgårdens IF Fotboll (women) players
Glasgow City F.C. players